Montpelier is an unincorporated community in Hanover County, Virginia, United States.

References

GNIS reference

Unincorporated communities in Virginia
Unincorporated communities in Charles City County, Virginia

{{Hanover CountyVA-geo-stub}}